Miscanthus, or silvergrass, is a genus of African, Eurasian, and Pacific Island plants in the grass family, Poaceae.

 Species
 Miscanthus changii Y.N.Lee –  Korea
 Miscanthus depauperatus Merr. – the Philippines
 Miscanthus ecklonii (Nees) Mabb. – southern Africa
 Miscanthus floridulus – China, Japan, Southeast Asia, Pacific Islands
 Miscanthus fuscus (Roxb.) Benth. – Indian Subcontinent, Indochina, Pen Malaysia
 Miscanthus junceus – southern Africa
 Miscanthus lutarioriparius L.Liu ex S.L.Chen & Renvoize – Hubei, Hunan
 Miscanthus nepalensis (Trin.) Hack. – Indian Subcontinent, Tibet, Yunnan, Myanmar, Vietnam, Pen Malaysia
 Miscanthus nudipes (Griseb.) Hack. – Assam, Bhutan, Nepal, Sikkim, Tibet, Yunnan
 Miscanthus × ogiformis Honda – Korea, Japan
 Miscanthus oligostachyus Stapf. – Korea, Japan
 Miscanthus paniculatus (B.S.Sun) S.L.Chen & Renvoize – Guizhou, Sichuan, Yunnan
 Miscanthus sacchariflorus – Korea, Japan, northeastern China, Russian Far East
 Miscanthus sinensis – Korea, Japan, China, Southeast Asia, Russian Far East; naturalized in New Zealand, North America, South America
 Miscanthus tinctorius (Steud.) Hack.  – Japan
 Miscanthus villosus Y.C.Liu & H.Peng – Yunnan
 Miscanthus violaceus (K.Schum.) Pilg. – tropical Africa

 formerly included
see Chloris, Pseudopogonatherum, Saccharum, and Spodiopogon 
 Miscanthus affinis – Pseudopogonatherum quadrinerve 
 Miscanthus cotulifer – Spodiopogon cotulifer
 Miscanthus polydactylos – Chloris elata 
 Miscanthus rufipilus – Saccharum rufipilum 
 Miscanthus tanakae – Pseudopogonatherum speciosum

Physiology 
A wide variety in cold tolerance occurs in the genus. M. × giganteus is especially vulnerable to cold, and a cultivar of M. sinensis has the best known cold tolerance.

Miscanthus sinensis 

M. sinensis is widely cultivated as an ornamental plant, and is the source of several cultivars. In Japan, where it is known as susuki (すすき), it is considered an iconic plant of late summer and early autumn. It is mentioned in the Man'yōshū (VIII:1538) as one of the seven autumn flowers (aki no nana kusa, 秋の七草). It is used for the eighth month in hanafuda playing cards. It is decorated with bush clover for the Mid-Autumn Festival. Miscanthus has also excellent fiber properties for papermaking.

Miscanthus × giganteus 

Miscanthus × giganteus (Miscanthus giganteus, giant miscanthus) is a highly productive, rhizomatous C4 perennial grass, originating from Asia. 
Just like Pennisetum purpureum and Saccharum ravennae (which grow to the same height), it is also called "elephant grass".

Miscanthus' ability to grow on marginal land and in relatively cold weather conditions, its rapid  absorption, its significant carbon sequestration, and its high yield make it a favorite choice as a biofuel.

Miscanthus is mainly used for heat and power, but can also be used as input for ethanol production (if harvested wet). If harvested dry, it can be burnt directly in biomass boilers, or processed further (pellets, briquettes). It can also be used as a "green" building material, for both wall construction and as general insulation. An experimental house based on Miscanthus straw bales was built in 2017. Miscanthus cropping enhances nutrient cycling in the plant–soil system.

References

External links
 UK's National Centre for Biorenewable Energy, Fuels and Materials
 Miscanthus × giganteus - as an energy crop - Miscanthus Research at the University of Illinois

 
Grasses of Africa
Grasses of Asia
Energy crops
Poaceae genera
Andropogoneae